The 1949 U.S. Women's Open was the fourth U.S. Women's Open, held September 22–25 at Prince George's Country Club in Landover, Maryland, a suburb east of Washington, D.C.

Louise Suggs led wire-to-wire and won the first of her two U.S. Women's Open titles, fourteen strokes ahead of runner-up Babe Zaharias, the defending champion. It was the fourth of eleven major championships for Suggs.

The course no longer exists and is now the site of Kentland Community Center Park.

Past champions in the field

Final leaderboard
Sunday, September 25, 1949

References

External links
USGA final leaderboard
U.S. Women's Open Golf Championship
U.S. Women's Open – past champions – 1949

U.S. Women's Open
Golf in Maryland
Sports competitions in Maryland
Women's sports in Maryland
U.S. Women's Open
U.S. Women's Open
U.S. Women's Open
U.S. Women's Open